Faure is an Occitan family name meaning blacksmith, from Latin faber. It is pronounced differently from the accented surname Fauré, as in Gabriel Fauré, French composer and organist.

People

Politicians
 Dominique Faure (born 1959), French politician 
 Edgar Faure, French politician
 Félix Faure, 19th-century French president
 Fernand Faure (1853–1929), French economist and politician
 Jacques Faure (ambassador), French co-chair of the OSCE Minsk Group
 Martine Faure, French politician
 Maurice Faure, French Resistance leader and politician, and the last surviving signatory of the Treaty of Rome
 Sébastien Faure, French anarchist
 Faure Gnassingbé, president of Togo

Writers, artists, and musicians
Élie Faure, French art historian and essayist
Gabriel Faure (1877-1962), French poet, novelist and essayist
Gabriel Fauré, French composer
Jean-Baptiste Faure, French baritone and composer
Lucie Faure, French writer
Renée Faure, French actress

Others
 Abraham Faure (1795-1875), South African clergyman
 Camille Alphonse Faure, French chemical engineer
 Gunter Faure, American geochemist
 Jacques Faure (French Army officer) (1904–1988), French Army general and skier
 Jacques-Paul Faure (1869–1924), head of the French military mission to Japan (1918–19)
 Keith Faure, Australian career criminal
 Luigi Faure (1901–1974), Italian cross-country skier, Nordic combined skier, and ski jumper
 Sébastien Faure (footballer), French footballer

See also
 Fauré
 Faur

Occitan-language surnames